Danyahira Sirpa is an award given for the best people in the field of Nepal Bhasa. This award get its name from the names of Dana Ratna, Yagna Ratna & Hira Devi Dhakhwa. It is an award of fifty thousand rupees along with a citation on copper plaque is presented annually to a person or group that has made outstanding contributions or achievements in the field of Newari literature or music. The award was started from 2004.

Awarded people

See also

 List of awards for contributions to culture

References 

Awards for contributions to culture
Nepalese awards
2004 establishments in Nepal